Buchanan County is the name of three counties in the United States of America, each named for American statesman James Buchanan during his lifetime:

Buchanan County, Iowa 
Buchanan County, Missouri 
Buchanan County, Virginia